Franchuk is a Ukrainian surname Франчук. Notable people with the surname include:

Anatoliy Franchuk (1935–2021), Ukrainian politician
Olena Franchuk (born 1970), Ukrainian philanthropist and businesswoman
Orv Franchuk (born 1944), American college baseball player

See also
 

Ukrainian-language surnames